The Southern Cross Classic is a defunct WTA Tour affiliated tennis tournament played in 1988. It was held in Adelaide in Australia and played on outdoor hard courts.

Finals

Singles

Doubles

References
 WTA Results Archive

 
Hard court tennis tournaments
Defunct tennis tournaments in Australia
WTA Tour